Compsosuchus (meaning "elegant crocodile") is an extinct genus of abelisauroid dinosaur. It lived during the Late Cretaceous in India.

Discovery and naming
Compsosuchus was described in 1933 by von Huene and Matley. The type species is C. solus, and the type and only specimen is GSI K27/578, an axis with an articulated axial intersection.  The genus is often considered a nomen dubium.

Classification
Although classified as an allosaurid by Huene and Matley (1933) and Molnar et al. (1990) because of superficial similarities with the axis vertebrae of Allosaurus, a 2004 review of Lameta Formation theropods found it to be similar to members of the Abelisauridae, including Carnotaurus and Indosaurus, necessitating the placement of Compsosuchus as an abelisaurid. However, Compsosuchus has been more recently assigned to the Noasauridae.

See also

 Timeline of ceratosaur research

References

Abelisaurids
Late Cretaceous dinosaurs
Dinosaurs of India and Madagascar
Nomina dubia
Fossil taxa described in 1933
Taxa named by Friedrich von Huene
Taxa named by Charles Alfred Matley